Paul Anthony Jones III (born July 3, 1989) is an American professional basketball player. Standing at 1.98 m (6'6"), he plays the small forward position. After two years at Whatcom Community College and Western Washington College each, Jones entered the 2013 NBA draft but was not selected in the draft's two rounds.

High school career
Jones played high school basketball at Kent-Meridian High School, in Kent, Washington.

College career
Jones played college basketball at Whatcom Community College from 2009 to 2011 and at Western Washington University with Western Washington Vikings each from 2011 to 2013.

Professional career
On October 8, Jones signed with Haukar of the Icelandic Úrvalsdeild karla. In 30 games for Haukar, Jones averaged 18.2 points and 7.3 rebounds, helping them to the best record during the regular season and a trip to the semi-finals in the playoffs, where they lost to eventual champions KR.

In August 2018, Jones signed with Stjarnan of the Úrvalsdeild karla. After a disappointing start for Stjarnan, who were predicted as the favorites to win the national championship prior to the season, Jones was released in December in a roster overhaul. In 10 games for Stjarnan, he was the team's leading scorer with 20.2 points per game while also averaging 7.1 rebounds and shooting 40.0% from the three-point range.

In August 2021, Jones signed with Haukar. In end of September 2021, it was reported that he would to play for the team in the upcoming season.

References

External links
ESAKE.gr Profile
WWVikings.com Profile
Icelandic statistics
Paul Jones at realgm.com

1989 births
Living people
American expatriate basketball people in Greece
American expatriate basketball people in Iceland
American expatriate basketball people in Israel
American expatriate basketball people in Mexico
American expatriate basketball people in New Zealand
American expatriate basketball people in Uruguay
American men's basketball players
Aries Trikala B.C. players
Greek Basket League players
Haukar men's basketball players
Ironi Ashkelon players
Israeli Basketball Premier League players
Junior college men's basketball players in the United States
Manawatu Jets players
Stjarnan men's basketball players
Úrvalsdeild karla (basketball) players
Western Washington Vikings men's basketball players
Small forwards